Parliamentary elections were held in East Timor on 22 July 2017. Fretilin narrowly emerged as the largest party in the National Parliament, winning 23 seats to the 22 won by the National Congress for Timorese Reconstruction, which had been the largest party in the outgoing Parliament.

Background 

After the 2012 East Timorese parliamentary election, there was first of all a coalition of the National Congress for Timorese Reconstruction (CNRT), Democratic Party (PD), and Frenti-Mudança (FM). With the exit of Prime Minister Xanana Gusmão, the new Prime Minister, on February 16, 2015, Rui Maria de Araújo. Since there was no parliamentary opposition, Taur Matan Ruak, the President of East Timor, took on this role himself, leading to more conflict between the president and the rest of the government. This led to a split between the CNRT and the PD.

The creation of the People's Liberation Party (PLP), which was shortly after led by Taur Matan Ruak as he was no longer president after the 2017 East Timorese presidential election, was a major event in the run-up to the election. The PLP was competing for many of the same voters as the PD, which was expected to cost the PD votes. After the sudden death of PD party leader Fernando de Araújo, António da Conceição took over his positions. However, he was supported in the election by the PLP and Kmanek Haburas Unidade Nasional Timor Oan (KHUNTO). The PLP also tended to use smaller rallies in its campaign than the rallies of the major parties, Fretilin and the CNRT.

Frenti-Mudança encountered difficulties, especially since Jorge da Conceição Teme, one of their top politicians, had gone over to the PDP.

Some observers speculated that there would be a shift in the power structure of East Timor. The younger generation had weaker ties to the old heroes of the East Timor independence campaign, and there was expected to be a greater influence from Facebook and other social media networks, which are very popular with the younger generation, will have more influence than traditional media.

In a nationwide poll from the International Republican Institute in November of 2016, 98% of the people whom they asked were planning to go vote. 72% expected that the state of East Timor would be better next year, and 49% thought it was already heading in the right direction. 29% of the sample thought that the government had done a very good job and 45% thought that the government had done a good job. 44% considered themselves to have a close connection to Fretilin and 75% had a positive opinion of the party. 29% saw the condition of roadways to be the most important issue facing the nation; 32% thought that the condition of roadways had worsened over the last year, but 29% thought that it had improved. A majority of the sample saw improvements in the areas of the healthcare system (79%), education (78%), and electricity (71%). 66% had concerns about violent riots around election time.

Electoral system
The government amended some provisions in the electoral law in 2016. Exiled East Timorese were given the right to vote. For this, they have to register, which causes problems. For example, there is a larger East Timorese community in Ireland and the United Kingdom. But their members have to register at the embassy in Lisbon. In Australia, where 20,000 eligible voters are expected (out of a total of 70,000 East Timorese), there are said to be several registration offices. In Portugal and the British Isles, there are about 20,000 East Timorese, of whom about 8,000 are expected to be eligible to vote. In East Timor itself, 728,363 eligible voters were registered as of August 2016, more than 153,000 of them in the national capital Dili alone. The voting age was lowered to at least 16 years. For the first time, voters who had not lived during the Indonesian occupation (1975-1999) thus took part. 369,000 (51%) of eligible voters are aged between 17 and 35; 118,000 (33%) are between 36 and 59 years old. 16% of voters are 60 years or older. 1,370 eligible voters are (as of December 2016) 16 years old.

The 65 members of the National Parliament were elected from a single nationwide constituency by closed list proportional representation. Parties were required to have a woman in at least every third position in their list, which had resulted in 38% of MPs being female before this election, with the last seat being awarded to the party with the fewest votes if there are several equal maximum numbers. The government rejected the proposal to raise the three percent hurdle to five percent. Seats were allocated using the d'Hondt method with an electoral threshold of 4%.

East Timorese will be able to vote between 7am and 3pm at 1121 polling stations in 859 polling centres and, for the first time, at overseas stations in Australia (Sydney, Melbourne and Darwin), South Korea (Seoul), Portugal (Lisbon), and the UK (London). As many East Timorese have not registered as voters in their place of residence, the electoral authorities estimate that half of the voters will have to travel to their place of origin in another part of the country. The government has therefore declared 21 July a public holiday to facilitate travel. According to the Secretáriado Técnico de Administração Eleitoral (STAE), 764,858 voters are registered. 163,129 of them live in the capital municipality of Dili alone, which is why there are 187 polling stations and 83 voting centres here alone. Baucau has 87,057 voters, Ermera 77,190 and Bobonaro 64,008, while Aileu (30,344) and Manatuto (30,344) have the fewest registered voters. 1,101 voters were registered in Australia, 589 in Portugal, 208 in the UK, and 227 in South Korea. 

The official election campaign began on 20 June and runs until 19 July. After election day on 22 July, counting at the municipal level is to be completed by 24 July. The final result should be known on 27 July. The election result will be confirmed by the East Timor Supreme Court of Justice by August 6th.

International election observers came from the European Union, led by five Members of the European Parliament, National Democratic Institute (NDI) and International Republican Institute (IRI) from the United States, Australian organisations and the diplomatic corps in Dili.

Parties and candidates 

Of the 31 registered parties in East Timor at the beginning of 2017, only the Christian Democratic Union of Timor (UDC), KHUNTO, and the Socialist Party of Timor (PST) had submitted their electoral lists as of 30 May. 27 parties had picked up forms for the lists but had not yet filled them out and submitted them to the East Timor Supreme Court of Justice. Court President Deolindo dos Santos pointed out that the country's highest court would only accept electoral lists submitted by 6pm on 1 June.

Finally, a total of 23 electoral lists were submitted, with one list consisting of the party alliance Bloku Unidade Popular (BUP). Among the contesting parties were also all four factions previously represented in parliament; CNRT, FRETILIN, PD, and FM.

For the first time, the PLP, the Timorese Social Democratic Action Center (CASDT), the Hope of the Fatherland Party (PEP), the Democratic Unity Development Party (PUDD), and the Freedom Movement for the Maubere people (MLPM) contested.

It was initially unclear whether the Timorese Social Democratic Association (ASDT) would be admitted to the election. As in 2012, two different electoral lists from different groupings of the party were received by the Supreme Court of Justice. One from party leader João Andre Avelino Correia, one from party president Francisco da Silva and secretary general Norberto Pinto. If the ASDT had still been admitted, Silva's and Pinto's list would have been recognised. However, admission was eventually denied.

Five registered parties did not contest the election. The East Timor National Republic Party (PARENTIL) left the electoral alliance BUP at short notice and did not put up its own list. The Timorese Nationalist Party (PNT) had already submitted its electoral list too late in 2012 and therefore did not participate in the election. This time, too, no electoral list arrived at the court in time. The Timorese Labor Party (PTT) had contested the last election with a joint list with the Association of Timorese Heroes KOTA, but this no longer existed. The PTT did not come up with its own list. In the presidential elections at the beginning of the year, their party leader Angela Freitas had still won 0.84% of the vote. The National Unity Party (PUN) and the Liberal Party (PDL) also did not put up candidates.

The last review of the submitted applications ran until June 11th. The People's Party of Timor (PPT) also fell out. The party had not met the necessary eligibility criteria. Already in 2012, the PPT had not been admitted because it had submitted its electoral list too late. On 15 June, the order on the ballot paper was drawn.

Campaign 

Observers noted an increasing professionalisation of the election campaign in East Timor. Fretilin and CNRT posters dominated the street scene, but advertisements from UDT and PLP could also be seen. The CNRT relied on its leader Xanana Gusmão as its figurehead. They used the abbreviation "CR7", a reference to the footballer Cristiano Ronaldo, who is also popular in East Timor. The CNRT used drones to take aerial photos of infrastructure completed under the CNRT government and other developments in the country. The video was shared on social media and in TV spots on RTTL and the new private channel GMN TV. Fretilin also promoted videos showing a vibrant and active country. They focused the campaign on the young population and also used social networks. Instead of only talking to local leaders, they also went to the markets and parks and distributed promotional material and programmes. The new PLP, which had less money than the two big parties, also relied on social networks. The PLP campaign was led by young people, many of them former journalists from President Taur Matan Ruak's press office, such as Fidelis Leite Magalhães, who appeared alongside the former president in televised debates for the PLP. The publications and debates on the internet reached 400,000 East Timorese daily, a good third of the population. 

While the two big parties held central campaign events in the respective municipalities, where supporters (Militantes) were driven in from all corners, the PLP held its campaign events on a smaller scale at the level of the administrative posts. On the one hand, this was due to the smaller budget, on the other hand, the idea of the grassroots movement was the inspiration here. The PLP received support in the election campaign from the Amigos de Taur Matan Ruak (A-TMR). This movement was founded by, among others, Jorge da Conceição Teme, a member of the Frenti-Mudança, and Abílio Araújo, leader of the Timorese Nationalist Party PNT. Other members belonged to the CNRT, FRETILIN and other parties. Despite their affiliation to other parties, the Amigos appeared at PLP events and promoted Taur Matan Ruak and the PLP during home visits.

In the election campaign, the PLP set different priorities than the Fretilin and the CNRT, especially on the issue of land development. Instead of large-scale projects, such as the special economic zone in Oe-Cusse Ambeno and the Tasi-Mane-project on the south coast, the PLP wanted to focus on basic health care and educational and agricultural programmes for the population. Oe-Cusse Ambeno was under the leadership of Freilin politician Marí Alkatiri, while the South Coast project in Cova Lima was attributed to the CNRT. The PLP criticised, for example, that while there was a new highway along the south coast, the more important connecting road from Suai to Dili remained in poor condition.

In 2012, KHUNTO only narrowly failed to clear the three-percent hurdle. The party is said to have particularly close ties to large local martial arts groups. Its campaign was mainly aimed at the unemployed and disillusioned youth.

The non-party former president and prime minister, Nobel Peace Prize laureate José Ramos-Horta, attracted attention on social media by praising Fretilin politicians Alkatiri and Francisco Guterres for stabilising the country. However, similar words followed later about CNRT leader Xanana Gusmão and the call for PLP leader Taur Matan Ruak to reconcile with him.

The election campaign was generally peaceful. Only in the municipality of Baucau were there complaints from Fretilin that former guerrillas had tried to intimidate voters.

On the last day of the official election campaign, 19 July, the PLP held its final rally at Baucau airport and Fretilin gathered its supporters at the Nicolau Lobato monument in Dili. The moratorium until election day was generally followed. By 20 July, the election posters had disappeared from the streetscape. Only in the social networks did pictures of the parties' closing events continue to circulate.

Results

References

Notes

Further reading

External links

East Timor
2017 in East Timor
Elections in East Timor
July 2017 events in Asia